Susan Bandecchi (born 1 July 1998) is a Swiss tennis player. She reached a career-high singles ranking of world No. 164 on 7 March 2022, and her best doubles ranking of world No. 141 on 11 July 2022.

Professional career

2013–2017: Professional debut
She started playing tennis at the age of five. Since 2013, she has played on the professional tour, mainly at ITF Circuit tournaments. In 2017, she won her first ITF doubles tournament in Caslano, Switzerland, partnering her compatriot Lisa Sabino.

2019–2020: WTA Tour debut
In November 2019, Bandecchi made her WTA Tour debut at the Taipei tournament, where she participated in both singles and doubles. 

In 2020, Bandecchi won the ITF tournament in Lousada, Portugal, in singles, beating the Dutch player Arianne Hartono in the final. Together with Lara Salden from Belgium, she also won the doubles title in Lousada.

2021: First WTA title in doubles
She won her first doubles title at the 2021 Ladies Open Lausanne, partnering Simona Waltert.

Grand Slam singles performance timeline

WTA career finals

Doubles: 1 (1 title)

ITF finals

Singles: 9 (4 titles, 5 runner–ups)

Doubles: 6 (2 titles, 4 runner–ups)

Ranking history

References

External links
 
 

1998 births
Living people
Swiss female tennis players